The New Inventors was an Australian television show, broadcast on ABC1 from 2004 to 2011. The program is hosted by broadcaster and comedian James O'Loghlin. Each episode features three Australian inventions and entertaining short video tape packages.

Season 1 (2004)

Season 2 (2005)

Season 3 (2006)

Season 4 (2007)

Season 5 (2008)

Season 6 (2009)

Season 7 (2010)

Season 8 (2011)

References 

New Inventors